The 2002 Delphi Indy 300 was an Indy Racing League (IRL) motor race that took place on September 8, 2002, at Chicagoland Speedway in Joliet, Illinois, in front of approximately 50,000 spectators. It was the 14th of 15 scheduled rounds of the 2002 Indy Racing League and the second annual running of the event. Panther Racing driver Sam Hornish Jr. won the 200-lap race from pole position with the closest margin of victory in the IRL of 0.0024 seconds over Al Unser Jr. of Kelley Racing. Third place was Hemelgarn Racing's Buddy Lazier.

Hornish earned his second IRL pole position by posting the fastest qualifying lap. Hornish led the race until he was passed by Buddy Rice after the first restart, which was prompted by a caution on the 25th lap to tend to Laurent Rédon's car. Hornish retook the lead after passing Unser on lap 75, but he was overtaken by Scott Sharp 42 laps later. On lap 151, Sharp was passed by Hornish for first place. On the 167th lap, Unser passed Hélio Castroneves and reclaimed the lead. For the rest of the race, Unser and Hornish traded the lead, and it was Hornish who won, his fourth of the season and seventh overall.

During the race, there were five cautions and eighteen lead changes between four drivers. Hornish now led the points standings with 481 points. Castroneves, who led the championship before the race, fell to second, while Team Penske teammate Gil de Ferran fell to third after a heavy crash on the 52nd lap. Felipe Giaffone and Alex Barron remained fourth and fifth with one race remaining in the season.

Background
The 2002 Delphi Indy 300 was confirmed as a part of the 2002 Indy Racing League (IRL) schedule for their racing series in June 2001. It was the event's second consecutive running; it was the 14th race scheduled for 2002 by the IRL, out of 15, and it took place at the  Chicagoland Speedway D-shaped asphalt tri-oval race circuit, in Joliet, Illinois, on September 8, 2002, with a scheduled race distance of 200 laps (. Helio Castroneves led the points standings with 437 points at this late stage of the season. He was one point ahead of teammate Gil de Ferran, who was seven points ahead of Sam Hornish Jr. in third. Felipe Giaffone was fourth with 391 points, 73 more than Alex Barron in fifth. Jaques Lazier was the event's reigning winner from the 2001 edition.

The event featured 26 participants from 19 different teams, with two driver changes. Every competitor drove a Dallara IR-02 or G-Force GF05 car powered by a Chevrolet or Infiniti engine. 1999 U.S. F2000 National Champion and two-time Indy Lights series winner Dan Wheldon joined Panther Racing to partner Hornish for the final two races of the season. In June, he visited Chicagoland Speedway to learn more about the IRL. Wheldon expressed his excitement to be associated with and work with Panther Racing, and expressed his belief that it would be a good opportunity to learn from the team's personnel. 1999 Indy Racing League champion Greg Ray was hired to drive the  20 Greg Ray, the 1999 Indy Racing League champion, was hired to drive the  20 Sam Schmidt Motorsports car for the rest of the season after requesting a release from his former manager A. J. Foyt. Ray replaced regular driver Richie Hearn, who broke his foot at the Belterra Casino Indy 300 in August 2002.

Practice and qualifying

There were four practice sessions preceding Sunday's race; two on Friday and Saturday. The first and second sessions lasted 90 minutes, the third 60 minutes and the fourth 30 minutes. The racers were split into two groups, which were each allowed to run laps for half a session. The Friday practice sessions were held in warm, sunny weather. The first yellow caution flag flew when Hideki Noda's engine failed leaving the fourth turn and stopped on the backstretch; he did not participate in the second session because his team was changing his engine. The second occurred when Giaffone collided with the outside retaining barrier between turns three and four, and Hornish was involved, bending his left-front suspension, front wing, and puncturing his chassis tub. Both drivers were uninjured. Buddy Rice led the session with a time of 24.4578 seconds, followed by Eddie Cheever Jr. and Billy Boat. The top five were completed by Vítor Meira and Sarah Fisher.

Hornish's car's left-front section was repaired in time for the second session, where he set the fastest lap of 24.4910 seconds; Cheever was second and Rice third. Al Unser Jr. and Giaffone were fourth and fifth. Two caution flags came out for track inspections. The third practice session was held in sunny and warm weather, with Unser setting the fastest lap time of 24.5953 seconds. Rice was second, with Meira third. Boat was fourth, with Robbie Buhl fifth.

The starting grid was determined by qualifying an hour after the third practice session ended. Each driver completed two laps, and the competitor with the slowest time did not qualify. The weather was pleasant and sunny. Hornish set a new track record at Chicagoland Speedway, his second of the season and his career, with a time of 24.5528 seconds at a speed of  after winning the season-opening Grand Prix of Miami at Homestead–Miami Speedway. Rice, who was 0.0570 seconds slower than Hornish, joined him on the front row of the grid. Unser qualified third, with Boat fourth. Completing the top ten were Cheever, Wheldon, Laurent Rédon, Buhl, and Giaffone. The rest of the field lined up as De Ferran, Fisher, Jeff Ward, Eliseo Salazar, Airton Daré, Scott Sharp, Tony Renna, Alex Barron, Raul Boesel, Ray, Castroneves, Buddy Lazier, Will Langhorne, George Mack, and Noda. Scott Mayer did not qualify due to fluctuating oil pressure; the IRL barred him from competing due to inexperience. After qualifying, Hornish said he would put forward his strong form into the race, "When we start on the pole and the people were are running with for the championship are 11th and 20th or whatever, it helps out quite a bit."

The final practice session was held on Saturday afternoon in hot weather. The first caution came after 18 minutes when race officials discovered debris in turn two. Wheldon slowed in the fourth turn with his engine failing and engaged neutral gear before stopping nine minutes later. Hornish led with a lap of 24.3401 seconds with Unser Jr. second-quickest. Rice was third, with Wheldon fourth, and Cheever fifth.

Qualifying classification

Race
The conditions on the grid were dry and sunny. Approximately 50,000 spectators attended the event. USAC Chaplin Dave Cochran began pre-race ceremonies with an invocation. Singer Elle Gerdes performed the national anthem, and J.T. Battenberg, chairman, president, and CEO of the Delphi Corporation commanded the drivers to start their engines. The race commenced at 12:10 p.m. Central Daylight Time (UTC−05:00). and was broadcast live on television on ABC and by IMS Radio Network on radio via local Chicago affiliates WJOL and WAIT. Bob Jenkins hosted ABC's broadcast, with commentary provided by Scott Goodyear, and Paul Page. Jack Arute and Gary Gerould served as pit lane reporters. The IMS Radio broadcast team consisted of host Mike King, analyst Johnny Parsons Jr., turn commentator Mark Jaynes and pit lane reporters Kim Morris and John Murphy.

Hornish maintained his pole position advantage to lead the field into the first corner. After starting eleventh, De Ferran was seventh by the start of lap four. Nine laps later, De Ferran overtook Meira in turn two for sixth. The first caution flag was waved on the next lap when Rédon's engine failed in turn two, and he returned to pit road to retire. Several drivers chose to stop for fuel and tyres during the caution. Ward and Noda stopped for new front wings to be installed on their cars for aerodynamic reasons. The green flag was shown on lap 25 to resume racing. Hornish maintained his lead into turn one, but he was passed on the left two corners later by Rice. By lap 28, De Ferran had moved to fifth place. Three laps later, Unser was passed by Boat in turn one. Unser passed De Ferran on the outside of turn three on the 43rd lap for fourth. Unser used Noda's slower car to pass Hornish for second at turn one on lap 46. Unser led the field by 0.0375 seconds on lap 48 after drawing alongside Rice for one lap. Hornish quickly passed Rice. The second caution flag was displayed on lap 52.

De Ferran swerved to avoid Renna's lapped car, which slowed with no fuel pressure, and lost control of his vehicle entering turn two due to air catching his front wing. He sustained heavy car to his car's right-hand corner against the right-hand side wall, and stopped on the backstretch. Debris from his car landed on the circuit. Safety crews turned off De Ferran's car so that the IRL medical team could transport him to the medical helicopter to St. James Hospital in Olympia Fields, Illinois with a concussion and a hairline fracture on his left wrist. During the 22-lap caution, the field made pit stops for tires, fuel, and new front wings for aerodynamic reasons. On the 74th lap, Unser returned the field to green flag racing. Hornish retook the lead from Unser on the inside in the third corner of that lap. Hornish's 0.6869-second lead was erased on lap 87 when Salazar's rear wing fell backward; he spun on the backstretch, but no other cars collided with him, prompting the third caution flag. Several drivers made pit stops for fuel, tires, and new front wings for aerodynamic purposes, as with the previous two cautions.

On lap 94, racing resumed, with Hornish leading the pack of cars into turn one. By the 108th lap, Castroneves had moved to sixth place. Six laps later, the fourth caution flag was waved due to debris on the track. Several drivers, including Hornish, went down pit road for tyres and fuel. Sharp won the race off pit road and took the lead for the lap 120 restart. Boat slowed in turn four on that lap due to an electrical problem that shut down his engine. He retired on pit lan. On the 136th lap, Hornish and Lazier were alongside each other at turn two in the battle for second place. Three laps later, Hornish passed Lazier for second. Sharp had been gained on by Hornish by lap 144, who got alongside him for the lead in the fourth turn. Sharp beat him by 0.0042 seconds on that lap. On the 145th lap, green flag pit stops began, with Lazier entering pit road for tyres and fuel. Six laps later, Sharp made his first pit stop. Daré collided with the right-hand side wall as he exited turn two on lap 153. His car was severely damaged in the rear, but he climbed out without assistance. The crash prompted the fifth (and final) caution flag. Pit stops for fuel and tyres were made under caution.

Castroneves led the field into the first turn at the lap 166 restart. On the following lap, Unser became the new leader with Hornish returning to second. Hornish retook the lead from Unser on the 169th lap. On the next lap, Unser attempted to re-pass Hornish but the latter responded by blocking his path. Unser overtook Hornish on lap 172, but the latter retook the lead before the start-finish line. During lap 173, Boesel passed Rice and Cheever to take sixth. On the 178th lap, Hornish went up the track slightly, and Unser moved underneath him to lead the lap. As the rest of the field formed into a pack, Hornish and Unser raced alongside each other and exchanged the lead for the remaining 21 laps but Hornish won his fourth race of the season and seventh in 35 IRL events. Hornish's margin of victory over Unser was 0.0024 seconds (about ), the closest finish in IRL history. Lazier took third, beating Castroneves for the position on the final lap, and Cheever took fifth. Giaffone, Sharp, Meira, Rice, and Wheldon completed the top ten finishers. The final classified finishers were Boesel, Barron, Mack, and Ray. During the race, there were eighteen lead changes among four different drivers. Hornish led the most laps (102 total) on nine occasions.

Post-race
Hornish appeared in victory lane to celebrate his fourth victory of the season in front of the crowd; he earned $126,600 for winning the race. He said of his success at Chicagoland Speedway, "The fastest way around is to push another car around. But it's really hard to pass when you have to push a car aside. Having a guy that's experienced like Al, and all the races I've been in with him and all the respect I have for him, it's just like a high-speed pace lap." Unser said he enjoyed competing against Hornish, and the duel reminded him of his close victory over Scott Goodyear at the 1992 Indianapolis 500, "We just came up short again. I honestly thought that we won the race. I thought I had him. It was that close. I tell you, they don't come any closer than that.", and, "That was the closest wheel-to-wheel racing I think you'll see in the country today. There are fenders on those cars down south for a reason, and that's to rub on each other." Third-placed Lazier revealed his team were out of sequence during the fuel pit stops but it later worked in their favor, "We were just running wheel to wheel, as close as you could get. I'd get a run on someone, and my momentum would be stopped, and four or five guys would get by me until I would get my momentum back. But if you're patient and you bide your time, then you'll start picking them off. It was a lot of fun out there, but it sure was hair-raising."

Cheever accused Castroneves of intentionally blocking him and putting him in danger during the event's final laps, "I want to sit down with (IRL vice president of operations) Brian (Barnhart) and show him the last laps with Helio Castroneves. I want Brian's opinion on whether or not that is blocking. (Castroneves) totally moved me under the white line. Those aren't the rules of the game." Castroneves' response was, "As far as I'm concerned, my friend, I was racing, I was trying to be there and win the race and, hey, tough luck. In that particular time, he might be frustrated because he couldn't pass the guy and he tried to attack him. I know Eddie and hopefully he doesn't have any hard feelings." Four days after the race, Castroneves and Rice were fined an undisclosed sum of money for violating IRL rules 8.1 and 8.3. Barnhardt said of his reasoning in issuing the fines, "What makes this type of racing possible is a code of ethics that's been developed by the drivers and Indy Racing League officials over the past seven years. Both Helio and Buddy displayed actions on the track during the race Sunday that were not appropriate."

De Ferran was released from hospital a day later. He was later deemed unfit by Henry Block, the IRL's director of medical services, to compete in the season-closing Chevy 500 at Texas Motor Speedway held the following week. Block stated that it was preferable not to put De Ferran in further danger due to his injuries, "Recovery periods for any type of concussion vary for many reasons, but rarely do symptoms completely disappear in seven to 10 days." De Ferran expressed his disappointment but stated that he would respect Block's decision. He was replaced by Championship Auto Racing Teams driver Max Papis for the Chevy 500. Hornish's victory moved him to the lead of the points standings, with 481 points. Castroneves dropped to second place with 469 points, while teammate De Ferran remained third with 443 points. Giaffone and Barron completed the top five with 419 and 336 points, respectively.

Race classification

Notes
 — Includes two bonus points for leading the most laps.

Standings after the race

 Note: Only the top five positions are included for the drivers' standings.

References

2002 in IndyCar
2002 in sports in Illinois
Chicagoland Indy 300